Bước nhảy hoàn vũ is a reality show produced by Vietnam Television and Cát Tiên Sa Production. The show originates from the BBC series Strictly Come Dancing and is a part of the international Dancing with the Stars franchise. The first season aired from April 11 to June 20, 2010 with 8 pairs of celebrities and professional dancers. The show returned for its second season on April 17, 2011 and the third season on mid March, 2012.

The current panel of judges consists of Khánh Thi, Lê Hoàng and Trần Ly Ly, leaving Khánh Thi is the only original judge until this season. Lê Hoàng made a comeback after two seasons breaking. Former permanent judges were Chí Anh (from 2010 to 2012), Nguyễn Quang Dũng (2010 and 2011), Trần Tiến and Đức Huy (2011), Quốc Bảo and Hồ Hoài Anh (2012). Trần Ly Ly and Nguyễn Việt Tú were frequently special guest judges. Later, Trần Ly Ly was promoted to permanent judge in 2013 season.

Format 

The contestant pairs consist of a celebrity paired with a professional dancer. Past celebrity contestants include frequently supermodels, actors, dramatic actors, singers, and comedians. Each couple performs predetermined dances and competes against the others for judges' points and audience votes which carry equal weight. The couple receiving the lowest combined total of judges' points and audience votes is eliminated each week until only the champion dance pair remains. The celebrity will then be crowned The Dancing King/Queen.

The show is broadcast live every Sunday primetime on VTV3 and get the encore later on local channels and VTV4 - Channel for the oversea and foreigners / VTV6 - Channel for Youth as well. It is presented by Thanh Bạch and Thanh Vân, then from season 2 onwards Đoan Trang took Thanh Vân's place due to her pregnancy. The judging panel initially consisted of Khánh Thi, Chí Anh, Lê Hoàng and Nguyễn Quang Dũng. By the end of the first season/the beginning of second season, Quang Dũng had left the show and Lê Hoàng had confirmed to return but they didn't. Lê Hoàng stated to leave for Cặp đôi hoàn hảo. They all were replaced by Đức Huy and Trần Tiến in season 2. Under pressure from public critics, Trần Tiến with his stunts decided to quit after four-week judging and the producers got Quang Dũng back on the panel from the fifth week. In season 3, Thanh Vân got back her role on the show, meanwhile Thanh Bạch & Đoan Trang both left. Judges Đức Huy and Nguyễn Quang Dũng did not return, they are replaced by Quốc Bảo and a fourth guest judge each week.

The main singers on the show are Tiêu Châu Như Quỳnh, Hồ Trung Dũng, Lê Kim Ngân, Tuyết Mai, and Dương Ánh Linh.  Since its beginning Trung Dũng, Như Quỳnh, Khánh Linh have been parts. Joining them later are Kim Ngân and Tuyết Mai. Nguyễn Ngọc Phương Trinh, Xuân Phú, Thảo Xuân, Mr. A and duets Khánh Dung & Nguyên Lộc appeared several times as replacements.

 Judging panel

  Current
  Former
  Fourth guest judge

 Trần Tiến was a permanent judge from Week 1 through 3; Nguyễn Quang Dũng revived his role from Week 4.
 Quốc Bảo left the show after six weeks judging; Hồ Hoài Anh was his replacement.
 Hosts

  Current
  Former
  Guest host
  Previously a participant

Main series results

Season 1: 2010 

April 11 to June 20, 2010, in order of elimination:

Season 2: 2011 

April 17 to June 3, 2011, in order of elimination:

Season 3: 2012 

March 18 to June 17, 2012, in order of elimination

Season 4: 2013 

March 23 to May 25, 2013, in order of elimination

Season 5: 2014 
January 11

Season 6: 2015 
January 3

Season 7: 2016 

Trang Pháp, S.T Sơn Thạch, Jennifer Phạm will participate.

Professional dancers and their partners 

Key:
 Male professional
 Female professional
 Winner of the season
 Runner-up of the season
 Third place of the season
 Last place of the season
 Withdrew in the season

Statistics 
As of the end of season two Ngô Thanh Vân & Tihomir Gavrilov and Cao Thị Đoan Trang & Evgeni Popov, both from the first season hold the record for most perfect scores with two perfect 40 out of 40.

The lowest that the judges have ever awarded was 26/40 to Vũ Hoàng Điệp & Nicolay Nikolaev for their Waltz.

The most tens record goes to Ngô Thanh Vân & Tihomir Gavrilov and Cao Thị Đoan Trang & Evgeni Popov coincidentally. They tie at 27 tens, meanwhile the second season winning couple Vũ Thu Minh & Lachezar Todorov only gets 15 ones.
For the best average score from judges to all contestants, Ngô Thanh Vân & Tihomir Gavrilov currently come first on top of the all-time board being 37.5/40 for their dances, followed by Vũ Thu Minh & Lachezar Todorov (36.7/40), Cao Thị Đoan Trang & Evgeni Popov (36.5/40).

Highest and lowest scoring performances

The routines were not applied for scoring. During the season 1 finale, Đoan Trang & Evgeni chose it as their favorite and got scored. So did Ngô Thanh Vân & Tihomir.

Champions' Ranks

Runners-up' Ranks

Third Place Ranks

Controversies

Unfair scores 
In season 2 the case of Anh Khoa and Iva, all four judges gathered for quick break for discussion about giving scores unlike independently as usual.

And to all seasons, judges are harshly criticized for giving generous scores very sentimentally based upon the case that contestants or partners' sickness, family's bad luck, not so serious injury and so on. That discriminates much against participants who have devoted their really faithful performances based upon hardworking rehearsal and upon creativity. Season 1 winner Ngô Thanh Vân showed disagreement that she would quit because of scoring unfairness. Season 2 finalist Thủy Tiên expressed her feeling of wrong critics and bad scores.

Phone voting/Textgate 
In June 2011, the show hit the headlines when viewers were able to register telephone votes for a couple that effectively they could not save from the dance off irrespective of how many public votes were cast in their favour. Some voters claimed that they couldn't send messages voting for Anh Khoa & Iva eliminated the same week during textgate open, when received confirmatory text "Vui lòng nhắn tin bình chọn sau khi các thí sinh đã tham gia xong phần thi của mình. Xin chân thành cảm ơn" (literally: "Text after all performances done. Thank you for voting"). It is not clear if the "Thank you for voting" messages were incorrectly assigned, as if the replies were incorrectly assigned, votes would have been counted for the correct contestant despite the voters receiving the wrong "thank you" messages.  No message responded even 7 hours after texting was affirmed as well.

All involved including the broadcaster, producers and textgate owner informed no errors during week 9 (June 26) in public press. They also revealed the out of phase of the text-gate with live audience which meant people could only text formally from 30 seconds up to a minute in normal mode after the announcement of hosts and clearly voting could be continued during short time when the gate was deemed closed.

Cast members 
Many celebrity are claimed the involving in the show like Phan Anh, Ngọc Tình and Vĩnh Thụy of season 2 step by step replacing. Moreover, Vĩnh Thụy reservedly or unreservedly quit regarding on the accusation of smuggling from Australia to Vietnam by air and the lawsuit filed against him.

Timing violation 
Every performance should be performed in 1.5 minutes according to standard practices in almost all versions Dancing with the Stars and in international competitions. On June 6, 2011 the length of Thu Minh's performance was deemed the longest and the shortest performance was that of Đại Nghĩa with only 1 minute 40 seconds. Once again on June 26 and in the finale of season 2(July 3), Thu Minh & Lacho had additional performances.

Striptease 
Tendency of undressing on stage was up gradually, beginning in the first week and accumulating in the finale. It is more focused on the "tease" in "striptease" than the "strip". These actions are considered over-sexy, seductive and influence the culture in a bad manner.

Winner crowning 
There was much discussion in the communication industry about the real season two winner because there was confusion over the crowning. Initially, Đoan Trang revealed the runner-up, thus the other was the winner. Trang announced 79 scored by the runner-up. Moments that turned Thủy Tiên (who obviously scored 77) to the edge of glory and turned Thu Minh (who truly scored 79 out of possible 80) slightly blue was quickly stopped with the real name "Thủy Tiên", leading everyone got shocked.
Under too much pressure, producers finally agreed to make a press conference in free will to give info about textgate in order to clarify everything. Mistakes of mis-crowning was caused by result paper as interpreted.

Mimicking
On June 5, Thu Minh wowed the judging panel with her exotic dance concept that brought her two 10s for Samba. Later, it was revealed that the choreography and wardrobe she wore looked amazingly similar to those of Max Kozhevnikov and Yulia Zagoruychenko in the World Super Stars Dance Festival in 2006. In sudden press reports earlier in the week, two main judges Khánh Thi and Chí Anh stated "mimicking is actually self mastering, is the creativity of Thu Minh and Lachezar". Producers tried to help
Thu Minh, claiming it was not Thu Minh's fault, that the wardrobe was made from our set of designers' ideas and gave no comment about the choreography.

Producers' rigging 

Reportedly by various newspaper, producers rigged the show. Participants were eliminated as audience thought in an elimination order written in the screenplay. Lương Hoàng Anh, who was Huy Khánh's ex-wife, used Facebook note for raising a tension with the producers after he was out of the race. She also reported Khánh had said to their kid to watch his elimination on Bước nhảy hoàn vũ on Sunday night prior to his elimination actually occurred. Producers denied these claims as baseless, stating that there was officially a company collecting and analyzing messages, and the results were not be revealed by producers alone without VTV's permission.

Dance styles for seasons

See also 
Dancing Stars (Bulgarian TV series)
Strictly Come Dancing
Dancing with the Stars (U.S. TV series)
Dancing with the Stars - versions of the show produced in other countries
 Cặp đôi hoàn hảo - the corresponding format in Vietnamese, with singing instead of dancing
List of television programmes broadcast by Vietnam Television (VTV)

References

External links 
Bước nhảy hoàn vũ's official site

 
2010s Vietnamese television series
Vietnamese television series based on British television series